Tomislav Jurić (born 8 April 1990) is a Croatian football midfielder who plays for Čepin.

Club career
Jurić has had spells in Slovenia and Romania as well as in Austria where he last played for fourth-tier side USV Scheiblingkirchen-Warth.

References

External links
PrvaLiga profile 

Tomislav Jurić at Flashscore

1990 births
Living people
People from Kutina
Association football midfielders
Croatian footballers
Croatia youth international footballers
HNK Cibalia players
NK Zagreb players
NK Krka players
FC Brașov (1936) players
SV Horn players
Croatian Football League players
First Football League (Croatia) players
Slovenian PrvaLiga players
Liga I players
Austrian Regionalliga players
2. Liga (Austria) players
Austrian Landesliga players
Croatian expatriate footballers
Croatian expatriate sportspeople in Slovenia
Expatriate footballers in Slovenia
Croatian expatriate sportspeople in Romania
Expatriate footballers in Romania
Croatian expatriate sportspeople in Austria
Expatriate footballers in Austria